Gasparo Sartorio (1625 or 1626 - 1680) was an Italian Baroque composer, brother of musician Antonio Sartorio and architect Girolamo Sartorio. He was born and died in Venice. He held the post of organist at San Rocco, Venice until his death.

Selected works
1671 - Iphide greca (with Domenico Freschi)

References

Italian Baroque composers
1625 births
1626 births
1680 deaths